Eberhard Rebling (4 December 1911 – 2 August 2008) was a German pianist, musicologist and dance scholar as well as an anti fascist.

Life

Childhood and young adult
Born in Berlin, Rebling, who came from a Prussian officer's family, his father was a Major, began to learn to play the piano at the age of 7. He later received lessons from Lydia Lenz in Berlin-Friedenau and won 1st prize at the "Interpreters" Competition of the German Artists' Association in 1929. He played pieces by Sergei Prokofiev and Ernst Toch. After passing his Abitur at the Goethe-Gymnasium in Berlin-Wilmersdorf, Rebling studied musicology, among others with Friedrich Blume, Curt Sachs and Erich Moritz von Hornbostel, as well as German studies and philosophy at the Friedrich-Wilhelms-Universität Berlin. In 1932, he followed Ernst Busch and Hanns Eisler live on stage and got to know the Dutch art historian Leo Balet and subsequently began to study Marxism. He met Georg Lukács and Andor Gábor. In 1933, he experienced the Reichstag fire in Berlin and voted for the Communist Party of Germany. He finished his studies in 1935 with a dissertation for the Dr. phil. degree under the direction of Arnold Schering on Die soziologischen Grundlagen der Stilwandlung der Musik in Deutschland um die Mitte des 18. Jahrhunderts.

During the Second World War 
In 1936, Rebling emigrated to The Hague due to his opposition to the National Socialism regime. In the same year, the book Die Verbürgerlichung der deutschen Kunst, Literatur und Musik im 18. Jahrhundert, written together with Leo Balet, was published in Strasbourg and Leiden. In 1937, he went on a concert tour to Java and Sumatra as piano accompanist of a small dance company. In the same year, he met his wife, the Jewish actress, dancer and singer Lin Jaldati in The Hague, with whom he performed Yiddish songs in the post-war period.

Rebling took part in Dutch musical life as a pianist, music critic and musicologist. He attracted attention in 1937 with an article about De burgerlijke muziekopvattingen van Willem Mengelberg, which appeared in the monthly magazine Politiek en Cultuur. Between 1938 and 1940, Rebling gave lectures at the folk universities and at the College of Fine Arts in The Hague. He wrote articles for the music magazine Maandblad voor hedendaagse Muziek and the daily newspaper Vooruit.

In early 1943, Rebling bought a house in the Netherlands under a false name and offered shelter to up to 20 Jewish refugees. The hiding place was betrayed in 1944, he was arrested by the Gestapo and sentenced to death. Rebling was able to flee, but most of the Jews living in the house were arrested and deported to concentration camps, among them Lin, who survived the Westerbork transit camp, the Auschwitz concentration camp and Bergen-Belsen concentration camp. They met again in 1945. However, six of the hidden Jews did not survive the Holocaust. On 11 October 2007, Rebling was honoured by the Israeli Holocaust memorial Yad Vashem in Jerusalem with the title "Righteous Among the Nations" for helping the refugees. Rebling met Otto Heinrich Frank, the father of Anne Frank in 1945. He gave him a copy after the publication of  The Diary of a Young Girl. Rebling and his wife toured West Germany, France, Israel and the USA on an Anne Frank programme.

After the war 
After the German occupation of the Netherlands ended, Rebling first became music editor of the daily newspaper of the Dutch Communist Party, De Waarheid. He joined the Dutch Communist Party (CPN) in 1946.

In 1951, Paul Wandel convinced him to come to the GDR. In 1952, he moved with Lin Jaldati and his two daughters Kathinka and Jalda to Berlin (GDR), where he became a member of the Socialist Unity Party of Germany in 1960.

From 1952 to 1959, he was editor-in-chief of the newspaper Musik und Gesellschaft, from 1957 co-editor-in-chief of the music magazine Melodie und Rhythmus and from 1959 professor and rector of the Hochschule für Musik "Hanns Eisler", which was named "Hanns Eisler" on his initiative. Rebling was interested in ballet. After several journeys and his retirement in 1976, he wrote comprehensive works on the dance art of India and Indonesia. In 2002, he handed over his archive to the Academy of Arts, Berlin. In 1959, he accompanied Paul Robeson on the piano. In 1976, he performed with Ernst Busch and Gisela May at the Filmtheater Kosmos.

Rebling had been a member of the Volkskammer and the Research Council for Vocational Training in Music at the East-German Ministry of Culture since 1963. Until his death, he was a member of the Party of Democratic Socialism and later the Die Linke and lectured at political events on his time and situation during the Second World War. He was a member of the party's "Council of Elders".

Rebling died in Königs Wusterhausen at the age of 96 and is buried on the Dorotheenstadt Cemetery.

His younger daughter Jalda Rebling is a singer, the older Kathinka Rebling is a violinist and music professor.

Awards 
 1929 1. Preis beim "Interpretenwettbewerb des Deutschen Künstlerverbandes" in Berlin
 1954 Nationalpreis der DDR III. Klasse für Kunst und Literatur (im Kollektiv des Beethoven-Films)
 1956  in Gold
 1958  (with Lin Jaldati)
 1959 
 1960 Friedensmedaille
 1961 Patriotic Order of Merit in Bronze
 1971  in Gold
 1972 Vaterländischer Verdienstorden in Gold
 1976 
 1976 Ehrenspange zum Vaterländischen Verdienstorden in Gold
 1977 Ehrennadel des  in Gold
 1979  Medaille des World Peace Counciles für den hervorragenden Beitrag für Frieden und Völkerfreundschaft
 1981 Star of People's Friendship in Silver
 1985 
 1986 Order of Karl Marx
 2007 Righteous Among the Nations

Publications 

 Die soziologischen Grundlagen der Stilwandlung der Musik im 18. Jahrhundert. 1935 (Dissertation).
 Leo Balet and E. Gerhard [d. i. Eberhard Rebling]: Die Verbürgerlichung der deutschen Kunst, Literatur und Musik im 18. Jahrhundert.
 1st edition: Heitz, Straßburg/Leiden, 1936.
 2nd edition durch : Ullstein, Frankfurt/Berlin/Vienna 1973; 2., erweiterte Auflage, 1979.
 3rd edition: (. 61/62). , Dresden 1979.
 Revolutionnaire Liedern uit Nederlands Verleden. Amsterdam 1938.
 Den lustelijken Mai – Musik im 17. Jahrhundert in den Niederlanden. Amsterdam 1948.
 Een Eeuw Danskunst in Nederland. Querido, Amsterdam 1950.
 Johann Sebastian Bach en de overwinning van de barok. Arnhem 1951.
 Ballett Gestern und Heute. Henschel, Berlin 1956.
 Hans Joachim Moser, Eberhard Rebling (eds.): Robert Schumann, aus Anlass seines 100. Todestages. Breitkopf und Härtel, 1956.
 Musikbücherei für Jedermann – "Ballett". Reclam, Leipzig 1963.
 with Lin Jaldati: Es brennt, Brüder, es brennt. Jiddische Lieder. Berlin 1966.
 Ballett heute. Henschel, Berlin; Heinrichshofen, Bremerhaven 1970.
 Tanz der Völker. Berlin, Henschel; Bremerhaven, Heinrichshofen 1972.
 Ballettfibel. Henschel, Berlin 1974.
 Marius Petipa, Meister des klassischen Balletts. Heinrichshofen, Wilhelmshaven 1980.
 Das grosse Ballettlexikon. Ein Führer durch die Welt des Balletts von A bis Z. 4th edition. Heyne, Munich 1980, .
 Ballett A–Z. 4th edition. Henschelverlag Kunst und Gesellschaft, Berlin 1980.
 Ballett A–Z. Ein Führer durch die Welt des Balletts. 4th edition. Heinrichshofen, Wilhelmshaven 1980, .
 Ballett A–Z. 5th edition, Henschelverlag Kunst und Gesellschaft, Berlin 1984.
 Die Tanzkunst Indiens. Henschel, Berlin 1981; wieder Heinrichshofen, Wilhelmshaven 1982, .
 Die Tanzkunst Indonesiens. Noetzel, Wilhelmshaven 1989, .
 with Lin Jaldati: „Sag nie, du gehst den letzten Weg!“ Lebenserinnerungen 1911 bis 1988. Der Morgen, Berlin 1986, ; wieder (Sammlung. 1). BdWi-Verlag, Marburg 1995, .
 Eberhard Rebling im Gespräch mit Peter Schleuning: Entstehung und Wirkung des frühen Versuchs einer marxistischen Kunst- und Musikhistoriografie. In Wolfgang Martin Stroh, Günter Mayer (ed.): Musikwissenschaftlicher Paradigmenwechsel? Zum Stellenwert marxistischer Ansätze in der Musikforschung. BIS, Oldenburg 2000, .

Work 
 Vier Nigunim. 1943; Druckfassung: Vier Nigunim. Ostjüdische Volksmelodien für Klavier zu zwei Händen (Coll. Litolff. Nr. 5261). Peters, Leipzig; Litolff, Leipzig 1960,  (Partitur).
 Für Kathinka. 12 Kinderstücke (1960).

Recording 
 Lin Jaldati singt Lieder von Louis Fürnberg, Hanns Eisler and Mordechaj Gebirtig. Piano: Eberhard Rebling, 1957–1961, Hastedt 2008.

Radio 
 : Lin und Eberhard – Geschichte einer großen Liebe. Deutschlandfunk, 8 February 2013.

Filmography 
 Friedrich Schiller, Dokumentarfilm, DDR 1955, director: Max Jaap
 Lin Jaldati singt, Kurz-Dokumentarfilm, DDR 1962, director:

Archives

Further reading 
 Bernd-Rainer Barth: Rebling, Eberhard In  5th edition. Vol. 2. Ch. Links, Berlin 2010, .
 Eberhard Rebling. In , Hugo Fetting, : Exil in den Niederlanden und in Spanien (Kunst und Literatur im antifaschistischen Exil 1933–1945. Vol. 6; . Vol. 97). Röderberg-Verlag, Frankfurt 1981, pp. 58 ff.
 Traude Ebert-Obermeier: Eberhard Rebling. In Dietrich Brennecke, Hannelore Gerlach, Mathias Hansen eds.): Musiker in unserer Zeit. Member of the music section of the Akademie der Künste der DDR. Deutscher Verlag für Musik, Leipzig 1979, pp. 231 ff.
 Rebling, Eberhard. In Brockhaus-Riemann Musiklexikon. CD-ROM. Directmedia Publishing, Berlin 2004, .

References

External links 

 
 
 
 
 Eberhard Rebling: Autobiographische Skizze for the 

1911 births
2008 deaths
Musicians from Berlin
Socialist Unity Party of Germany members
Cultural Association of the GDR members
Party of Democratic Socialism (Germany) politicians
The Left (Germany) politicians
Members of the 4th Volkskammer
Members of the 5th Volkskammer
Members of the 6th Volkskammer
Members of the 7th Volkskammer
Members of the 8th Volkskammer
Members of the 9th Volkskammer
20th-century German musicologists
German music historians
German classical pianists
Music publishers (people)
Emigrants from Nazi Germany
Dutch resistance members
Recipients of the Patriotic Order of Merit (honor clasp)
German Righteous Among the Nations
Musik und Gesellschaft editors
East German musicians
East German journalists
Anne Frank